Justice Ellsworth refers to Oliver Ellsworth, the third chief justice of the United States Supreme Court. Justice Ellsworth may also refer to:

Sidney E. Ellsworth, associate justice of the North Dakota Supreme Court
William W. Ellsworth, associate justice of the Supreme Court of Connecticut